Hunain Shah (born 4 February 2004) is a Pakistani cricketer who is a right arm medium fast bowler for Central Punjab. 

He is the brother of Pakistan international cricketer Naseem Shah.

Career
Shah was selected for the development programme of the Lahore Qalandars in 2020. Shah played for the Central Punjab Whites U19 side in 2021. Shah made his senior T20 debut for Central Punjab in September 2022 taking 2-28 in his 4 overs against Khyber Pakhtunkhwa in the National T20 Cup at the Multan Cricket Stadium. In November 2020 he made his first-class debut for Central Punjab in the 2022–23 Quaid-e-Azam Trophy. On 18 November, 2022 he took his maiden first-class wicket dismissing Bilawal Iqbal of  the Balochistan cricket team.

References

External links
 

2004 births
Living people
Pakistani cricketers
People from Lower Dir District
Central Punjab cricketers